The Laurence Olivier Award for Best Family Show is an annual award presented by the Society of London Theatre in recognition of achievements in commercial London theatre. The awards were established as the Society of West End Theatre Awards in 1976, and renamed in 1984 in honour of English actor and director Laurence Olivier.

The award was introduced in 1991, as Best Entertainment, was renamed Best Entertainment and Family in 2012, and changed to its current name in 2020when "Entertainment" was moved to join Best Comedy Play on the renamed Best Entertainment or Comedy Play.

Winners and nominees

1990s

2000s

2010s

2020s

See also
 Drama Desk Award for Unique Theatrical Experience
 Tony Award for Best Special Theatrical Event

References

External links
 

Entertainment